The Italian Co-Belligerent Air Force (Aviazione Cobelligerante Italiana, or ACI), or Air Force of the South (Aeronautica del Sud), was the air force of the Royalist "Badoglio government" in southern Italy during the last years of World War II.  The ACI was formed in southern Italy in October 1943 after the Italian Armistice in September. As by this point the Italian Kingdom had defected from the Axis and had declared war on Germany, the ACI pilots flew for the Allies.

Description
A small part of the Italian Royal Air Force (Regia Aeronautica) remained under German control. This was known as the National Republican Air Force (Aeronautica Nazionale Repubblicana, or ANR), ostensibly part of the forces of Benito Mussolini's Fascist state in northern Italy, the Italian Social Republic (Repubblica Sociale Italiana).  The ANR pilots flew with the Axis.

By the end of 1943, 281 Italian warplanes had landed at Allied airfields, but most were no longer useful for combat. The crews of these aircraft were re-equipped with Allied aircraft and engaged in transport, escort, reconnaissance, sea rescue, and limited tactical ground support operations flying 11,000 missions from 1943 to 1945.

The ACI never operated over Italian territory, its objectives being always in the Balkans (Yugoslavia or Albania). This was to avoid any possible encounter between Italian-crewed aircraft fighting on opposite sides. During the entire history of ACI, no encounter, let alone combat, was ever reported between ACI and ANR aircraft.

The ACI formed the basis of the post-war Air Force of the Italian Republic (Aeronautica Militare Italiana).

Units
 2°Gruppo, 3°Stormo Trasporto, Aeronautica Cobelligerante del Sud, Lecce-Galatina, Southern Italy, November 1944
 10°Gruppo, 4°Stormo, Aeronautica Cobelligerante del Sud, Lecce-Galatina (Bell P-39 Airacobra) 
 20°Gruppo, 51°Stormo, Aeronautica Cobelligerante del Sud, Leverano (Spitfire)
 28°Gruppo, Stormo Baltimore, Southern Italy (Martin Baltimore)

Notable members
 Carlo Emanuele Buscaglia
 Carlo Negri
 Vittorio Sanseverino

Aircraft

 Ambrosini SAI.2S
 AVIA FL.3
 Breda Ba.25
 Breda Ba.39
 Bell P-39Q Airacobra
 Bell P-39N Airacobra
 CANT Z.501 Gabbiano
 CANT Z.506B Airone
 CANT Z.1007bis Alcione
 CANT Z.1018 Leone
 Caproni Ca.133
 Caproni Ca.164
 Caproni-Bergamaschi Ca.310 Libeccio
 Fiat BR.20M Cicogna
 Fiat CR.32bis
 Fiat CR.42 AS Falco
 Fiat G.8
 Fiat G.12T
 Fiat G.50bis Freccia
 Fiat RS.14B
 Macchi MC.200 Saetta
 Macchi MC.202 Folgore
 Macchi MC.205V Veltro
 Martin A-30 Baltimore III
 Nardi FN.305
 Reggiane Re.2001 Serie III Falco II
 Reggiane Re.2002 Ariete
 SAIMAN 200
 SAIMAN 202
 Savoia-Marchetti SM.75 Marsupiale
 Savoia-Marchetti SM.79 Sparviero
 Savoia-Marchetti SM.81 Pipistrello
 Savoia-Marchetti SM.82
 Savoia-Marchetti SM.84
 Spitfire LF.Mk.VB

See also
 Military history of Italy during World War II
 Pietro Badoglio
 Co-belligerence
 Regia Aeronautica (Italian Royal Air Force 1923–1943)
 Aeronautica Nazionale Repubblicana (Pro-Axis Air Force 1943–1945)
 Aeronautica Militare (Post-war Italian Air Force 1945–present)
 Italian Co-Belligerent Navy
 Italian Co-Belligerent Army

References

Bibliography

 D'Amico, F. and G. Valentini. Regia Aeronautica Vol. 2: Pictorial History of the Aeronautica Nazionale Repubblicana and the Italian Co-Belligerent Air Force, 1943-1945. Carrollton, Texas: Squadron/Signal Publications, Inc., 1986. .
 Mattioli, Marco. Bell P-39 Airacobra in Italian Service, Aviolibri Special 7 (Bilingual Italian/English). Roma, Italia: IBN Editore, 2003. . 
 Sgarlato, Nico. Italian Aircraft of World War II. Warren, Michigan: Squadron/Signal Publications, Inc., 1979. .

External links
 Italian Air Force

Italian Air Force
Military units and formations of Italy in World War II
Military units and formations established in 1943
1943 establishments in Italy